Daniel Reyes may refer to:

 Daniel Reyes (boxer) (born 1972), Colombian Olympic boxer
 Daniel de los Reyes (born 1962), American percussionist
 Daniel Reyes (Nicaraguan footballer) (born 1990), Nicaraguan footballer for Sport Boys
 Daniel Reyes (Peruvian footballer) (born 1987), Peruvian footballer for Alianza Atlético